George Anderson was a former association football player who represented New Zealand at international level.

Anderson made four appearances for the All Whites, all against the touring Canadians. His first match ended in a 2–2 draw on 25 June 1927, followed by a 1–2 loss, a 1–0 win and his final match a 1–4 loss on 23 July 1927

Anderson was one of the first players to appear in four Chatham Cup finals. he and three team-mates achieved the feat in the 1929 Chatham Cup final, Seacliff having already appeared in the finals in 1923, 1924, and 1925.

References 

New Zealand association footballers
New Zealand international footballers
Association football defenders
1896 births
1978 deaths